Sulikowo  is a village in the administrative district of Gmina Barwice, within Szczecinek County, West Pomeranian Voivodeship, in north-western Poland.

The settlement's German name indicates that the village was founded in the Middle Ages by German settlers.

For the history of the region, see History of Pomerania.

References

Sulikowo